Inishmeane is a small island and a townland off the coast of Gweedore, County Donegal, Ireland and was once home to a vibrant fishing community. The island has been unpopulated for decades but in recent years some people have started to return.

Geography
Inishmeane is around 1 kilometre off the coast of Gweedore. It lies between Gola Island (South-East) and Inishsirrer (North).

History
The island was inhabited up until the 1960s; today most of the buildings are derelict, but about eight have been renovated for use as holiday homes or permanent habitation.

On Inishmeane there is no electricity nor freshwater public supply.

A concrete pier was installed during the celtic tiger years to allow residents to moor their boats.

Demographics
The table below reports data on Inishmeane's population taken from Discover the Islands of Ireland (Alex Ritsema, Collins Press, 1999) and the Census of Ireland.

Gallery

See also
 List of islands of Ireland
 Inis Meáin (Aran Islands)

References

External links

  Ecological study of two Donegal islands: Inishfree and Inishmeane
 Guide to the island
 Aerial view of the entire island

Geography of Gweedore
Islands of County Donegal
Townlands of County Donegal